The Miss Massachusetts World competition is a beauty pageant that selects the representative for Massachusetts in the Miss World America pageant.

The current Miss Massachusetts World is Alissa Musto of Rehoboth.

Gallery of titleholders

Winners 
Color key

Notes to table

References

External links

Massachusetts culture
Beauty pageants in the United States
History of women in Massachusetts